East Orosi is a unincorporated community in Tulare County, California, United States. The population was 495 at the 2010 census, up from 426 in 2000. For statistical purposes, the United States Census Bureau has defined East Orosi as a census-designated place (CDP).

Geography

Demographics

2010
The 2010 United States Census reported that East Orosi had a population of 495. The racial makeup of East Orosi was 209 (42.2%) White, 0 (0.0%) African American, 5 (1.0%) Native American, 2 (0.4%) Asian, 1 (0.2%) Pacific Islander, 261 (52.7%) from other races, and 17 (3.4%) from two or more races. Hispanic or Latino of any race were 466 persons (94.1%).

The Census reported that 495 people (100% of the population) lived in households, 0 (0%) lived in non-institutionalized group quarters, and 0 (0%) were institutionalized.

There were 112 households, out of which 73 (65.2%) had children under the age of 18 living in them, 57 (50.9%) were opposite-sex married couples living together, 19 (17.0%) had a female householder with no husband present, 17 (15.2%) had a male householder with no wife present.  There were 16 (14.3%) unmarried opposite-sex partnerships, and 0 (0%) same-sex married couples or partnerships. 11 households (9.8%) were made up of individuals, and 3 (2.7%) had someone living alone who was 65 years of age or older. The average household size was 4.42.  There were 93 families (83.0% of all households); the average family size was 4.73.

The population was spread out, with 181 people (36.6%) under the age of 18, 72 people (14.5%) aged 18 to 24, 137 people (27.7%) aged 25 to 44, 74 people (14.9%) aged 45 to 64, and 31 people (6.3%) who were 65 years of age or older.  The median age was 24.2 years. For every 100 females, there were 126.0 males.  For every 100 females age 18 and over, there were 130.9 males.

The homeowner vacancy rate was 2.1%; the rental vacancy rate was 1.5%.  192 people (38.8% of the population) lived in owner-occupied housing units and 303 people (61.2%) lived in rental housing units.

2000
As of the census of 2000, there were 426 people, 102 households, and 89 families residing in the CDP. The racial makeup of the CDP was 49.06% White, 0.47% Native American, 2.82% Asian, 43.43% from other races, and 4.23% from two or more races. Hispanic or Latino of any race were 86.62% of the population.

There were 102 households, out of which 56.9% had children under the age of 18 living with them, 53.9% were married couples living together, 23.5% had a female householder with no husband present, and 12.7% were non-families. 9.8% of all households were made up of individuals, and 2.9% had someone living alone who was 65 years of age or older.  The average household size was 4.18 and the average family size was 4.33.

In the CDP, the population was spread out, with 38.7% under the age of 18, 12.9% from 18 to 24, 30.3% from 25 to 44, 11.7% from 45 to 64, and 6.3% who were 65 years of age or older.  The median age was 24 years. For every 100 females, there were 102.9 males.  For every 100 females age 18 and over, there were 103.9 males.

The median income for a household in the CDP was $26,071, and the median income for a family was $27,738. Males had a median income of $26,902 versus $9,500 for females. The per capita income for the CDP was $4,984.  About 37.1% of families and 51.4% of the population were below the poverty line, including 65.7% of those under age 18 and none of those age 65 or over.

Government

In the United States House of Representatives, East Orosi is in

Infrastructure
The community relies on two contaminated wells for household water. The water supply is tainted by nitrates, arsenic or bacteria traced to decades of agricultural runoff.

References

Census-designated places in Tulare County, California
Census-designated places in California